Coleus madagascariensis, synonym Plectranthus madagascariensis, called thicket coleus, Madagascar coleus and candle plant (a name shared with many other species), is a species of flowering plant in the family Lamiaceae. It is native to South Africa, eSwatini, Mozambique, Mauritius and Réunion, but not Madagascar. Its cultivar 'Variegated Mintleaf' has gained the Royal Horticultural Society's Award of Garden Merit.

References

madagascariensis
Garden plants of Africa
Flora of South Africa
Flora of Swaziland
Flora of Mozambique
Flora of Mauritius
Flora of Réunion
Plants described in 1806